Clarence Lemuel "Cupid" Childs (August 8, 1867 – November 8, 1912) was an American second baseman in Major League Baseball with a 13-season career from 1888, 1890–1901, playing for the Philadelphia Quakers, Cleveland Spiders, St. Louis Perfectos and Chicago Orphans of the National League and the Syracuse Stars of the American Association.

Early life
Childs was born in Calvert County, Maryland. During his career, much was apparently made of Childs' pudgy appearance. Standing 5'8" tall, he weighed 185 pounds. This led to the nickname of "Cupid", as he was said to resemble a cherub.

Career
The 1892 Spiders featured several stars, including future Hall of Fame members Cy Young, George Davis and Jesse Burkett. The team went to the league championship series, where they lost to the Boston Beaneaters. They had similar success in 1895, when they finished second in the league and played in the Temple Cup.

Childs was among the top ten players in the league in walks every season between 1890 and 1900; he finished second in walks every season between 1891 and 1894. He led the league in doubles and extra base hits in 1890. In May 1900, Childs was attempting a double play against the Pittsburgh Pirates when the Pirates player-manager Fred Clarke slid into him. There was a brief confrontation on the field, and then Childs spotted Clarke at a train station after the game. Childs charged Clarke and badly beat the manager in the ensuing fistfight. The next day, fans in Pittsburgh showed up in large numbers (triple the average Monday attendance) hoping to see a continuation of the scuffle, but the game was played without incident.

Childs' playing time fell off in his final season of 1901 (63 games, from 137 the previous year) as Pete Childs (no known relationship) played more of the team's games at second base. A career .306 hitter, Childs retired with a .416 on-base percentage, 991 walks and 269 stolen bases, having played more than 1400 games as a second baseman.

Later life
By the time he was 45, Childs was living in Baltimore, Maryland, and he had developed cirrhosis and nephritis (known as Bright's disease at the time). He died in Baltimore on November 8, 1912. He was buried there at Loudon Park Cemetery.

See also

 List of Major League Baseball career triples leaders
 List of Major League Baseball career runs scored leaders
 List of Major League Baseball career stolen bases leaders
 List of Major League Baseball annual runs scored leaders
 List of Major League Baseball annual doubles leaders

References

External links

Baseball players from Maryland
Major League Baseball second basemen
Philadelphia Quakers players
Cleveland Spiders players
St. Louis Perfectos players
Chicago Orphans players
Syracuse Stars (AA) players
1867 births
1912 deaths
People from Calvert County, Maryland
Toledo Swamp Angels players
Syracuse Stars (minor league baseball) players
Jersey City Skeeters players
Montgomery Black Sox players
Baltimore Orioles (IL) players
Schenectady Electricians players
Scranton Miners players
19th-century baseball players
Shamokin Maroons players